Waddington may refer to:

Places 
Waddington, Lincolnshire, large village in Lincolnshire, England
RAF Waddington, airforce station a few miles from the above village
Waddington, Lancashire, small village in Lancashire, England
Waddington, California, unincorporated community in Humboldt County, California, United States
Waddington, New York, town in St. Lawrence County, New York, United States
Waddington (village), New York, village located in the town of Waddington, New York, United States
Waddington, New Zealand, village in Canterbury, New Zealand
Mount Waddington, mountain in British Columbia, Canada
Waddington Range, mountain range in British Columbia, Canada

People 
Waddington (surname)

See also 
Waddingtons, a British publishing company